The 1984 NCAA Division III women's basketball tournament was the third annual tournament hosted by the NCAA to determine the national champion of Division III women's collegiate basketball in the United States.

Rust defeated Elizabethtown in the championship game, 51–49, to claim the Bearcats' first Division III national title.

The championship rounds were hosted in Scranton, Pennsylvania.

Bracket
First Round (round of 32)
 Susquehanna 77, Allegheny 61
 Elizabethtown 67, Scranton 58
 TCNJ 78, Rochester (NY) 58
 Buffalo St. 81, New Rochelle 67
 Eastern Conn. St. 54, Bridgewater St. 48
 Salem St. 69, WPI 50
 Stockton 77, Ohio Northern 69
 Kean 79, Muskingum 69
 Pitt.-Johnstown 64, Wis.-Whitewater 60
 Wis.-La Crosse 77, Carroll (WI) 67
 North Central (IL) 65, William Penn 57
 Gettysburg 79, Millikin 74
 Concordia-M’head 77, Pomona-Pitzer 58
 Bishop 71, St. Thomas (MN) 67
 Knoxville 82, UNC Greensboro 74
 Rust 83, Va. Wesleyan 65

Regional Finals (round of sixteen)
 Elizabethtown 73, Susquehanna 71
 TCNJ 63, Buffalo St. 60
 Salem St. 66, Eastern Conn. St. 54
 Kean 62, Stockton 54
 Pitt.-Johnstown 88, Wis.-La Crosse 64
 North Central (IL) 85, Gettysburg 74
 Bishop 73, Concordia-M’head 71
 Rust 80, Knoxville 76

Elite Eight

All-tournament team
 Page Lutz, Elizabethtown (MOP)
 Shelley Parks, Elizabethtown
 Brenda Christian, Rust
 Evelyn Oquendo, Salem State
 Cheryl Juris, North Central (IL)

See also
 1984 NCAA Division I women's basketball tournament
 1984 NCAA Division II women's basketball tournament
 1984 NCAA Division III men's basketball tournament
 1984 NAIA women's basketball tournament

References

 
NCAA Division III women's basketball tournament
1984 in sports in Pennsylvania